The 2023 Tenerife Challenger II was a professional tennis tournament played on hard courts. It was the third edition of the tournament which was part of the 2023 ATP Challenger Tour. It took place in Tenerife, Spain between 30 January and 5 February 2023.

Singles main-draw entrants

Seeds

 1 Rankings are as of 16 January 2023.

Other entrants
The following players received wildcards into the singles main draw:
  Nicolás Álvarez Varona
  Salvatore Caruso
  Martín Landaluce

The following player received entry into the singles main draw using a protected ranking:
  Roberto Marcora

The following player received entry into the singles main draw as an alternate:
  Alessandro Giannessi

The following players received entry from the qualifying draw:
  Daniel Cox
  Matteo Gigante
  Shintaro Mochizuki
  Alejandro Moro Cañas
  Gian Marco Moroni
  Valentin Royer

The following player received entry as a lucky loser:
  Lorenzo Giustino

Champions

Singles

 Matteo Arnaldi def.  Raúl Brancaccio 6–1, 6–2.

Doubles

 Christian Harrison /  Shintaro Mochizuki def.  Matteo Gigante /  Francesco Passaro 6–4, 6–3.

References

2023 ATP Challenger Tour
2023 in Spanish tennis
January 2023 sports events in Spain
February 2023 sports events in Spain
2023